The Ministry of Education and Training (MOET) is the government ministry responsible for the governance of general/academic education and higher education (training) in Vietnam.  Vocational Education is controlled by the Ministry of Labour, Invalids, and Social Affairs (MoLISA).   Ministry offices are located in central Ha Noi, on Co Dai Viet street. In the Vietnamese system, MoET is responsible for the 'professional' performance and regulation of educational institutions under it, but not for ownership or finance, except for the major public universities (VNU, Vietnam National University, in Hanoi and Ho Chi Minh City, fall directly under the Prime Minister's office, not MoET).  Ownership and administrative/financial responsibility for the bulk of educational institutions, including all school-level general education, falls under Provinces or Districts, which have substantial autonomy on many budgetary decisions under the Vietnamese constitution. Some institutions are also controlled by other central ministries, although mainly at higher education levels (senior secondary and colleges).

Departments
The Ministry maintains provincial-level departments (DoETs, Departments of E&T), under which there are also district offices (BoETs, for Bureau of E&T), and central departments.  Central departments of note include:
 Science and Technology Activities in Education and Training
 Information and Communication Technology Centre
 National Institute for Education Strategy and Curriculum Development
 Education Publishing House
 Educational Equipment Company No. 1

Universities
Colleges and universities under the maintenance of the Ministry of Education and Training include:
 Hanoi University of Science and Technology
 Ho Chi Minh City University of Education (or Ho Chi Minh City Pedagogical University)
 College of Social Labour
 College of Chemicals
 Ho Chi Minh City College of Marketing
 College of Mining Engineering
 Ho Chi Minh City Procuratorial College
 University of Trade Unions
 Institute of Journalism and Propaganda
 Hanoi University of Education No.2
 Hanoi National University of Education
 Quy Nhon University of Education
 Ho Chi Minh City Technical Teacher Training University
 Banking University, Ho Chi Minh City
 Hanoi Open University (HOU)
 Phuong Dong University
 Van Lang University (VLU)
 Hung Vuong University (HVU)
 Duy Tan University (DTU)

See also
 Education in Vietnam
 List of universities in Vietnam
 Vocational schools of the Ministry of Industry
 Ministry of Transport schools and colleges

References

External links
 Ministry of Education and Training
 National Institute for Education Strategy and Curriculum Development at Ministry site
 Education Publishing House and list of subsidiaries, at Ministry site

Education in Vietnam
Educational organizations based in Vietnam
Vietnam
Education
Governmental office in Hanoi